Cheeks Hill is a hill on Axe Edge Moor in the Peak District, England. It lies just south of the Cat and Fiddle Road near Buxton, and forms part of the border between Derbyshire and Staffordshire.

Profile
Just south-west of the summit, there is a dry stone wall marking the border between Staffordshire and Derbyshire. On the Staffordshire side there is a disused quarry and shaft. On the Derbyshire side is Dane Head which is the start of the River Dane. Cheeks Hill lies one mile north-east of Three Shires Head, where Staffordshire, Derbyshire and Cheshire meet.

References 

Hills of Staffordshire
Mountains and hills of Derbyshire
Mountains and hills of the Peak District
Highest points of English counties